The Bipartisan Student Loan Certainty Act of 2013 was a bill signed into law by President Barack Obama on August 9, 2013, which, after more than a month of contentious debate between both parties about higher education and how the government should distribute loans, sets federal student loan rates to financial markets on all DIRECT student loans disbursed on or after July 1, 2013. There are maximum rate caps for Undergrad, Graduate PLUS and Parent PLUS loans. Democrats had originally planned to extend the low 3.4% rate for another 1–2 years but the bill, sponsored by Sen. Jack Reed (D-RI), was filibustered. Republicans in the House created a market-based approach, and the two sides eventually reconciled, after Sen. Joe Manchin (D-WV) and Sen. Angus King (I-ME) broke away from the Democratic Caucus to side up with the Republican bill, to prevent undesired gridlock.

References

External links
Student Aid
White House

Student loans in the United States
Acts of the 113th United States Congress